The Bravery Council of Australia Meeting 76 Honours List was announced by the Governor General of Australia on 10 March 2012.

Awards were announced for 
the Star of Courage,
the Bravery Medal,
Commendation for Brave Conduct and
Group Bravery Citation.

† indicates an award given posthumously.

Star of Courage (SC)
Robert McKenzie Fenwick†, New South Wales

Bravery Medal (BM)
Anthony Robert Ayers, Queensland
Benjamin Baiada, New South Wales
Sergeant Lisa Joy Blick, Victorian Police
Michael Hastings Carter, New South Wales
Paul Andrew Erlandsen, Victoria
Brett Raymond French, New South Wales
Arron Damien Graham, Victoria
Peter Gerard Halcro, New South Wales
Terrence Bruce Hall, Victoria
Constable Andrew James Hawkins, Queensland Police
Paul Jackman†, late of New South Wales
Paul Steven Moffatt, New South Wales
Mr Ben Dolphas Pere, Western Australia
Stojce Petreski†, late of New South Wales
Nathan Owen Schofield, New South Wales
Mr Robert Sparkes, New South Wales
Lisa Jane Webster, Victoria
Michael Patrick Williams,  New South Wales
Peter Lloyd Williams, New South Wales

Commendation for Brave Conduct
Robert Luis Bosetti, Victoria
Lynn Maree Brooks, Victoria
Leading Senior Constable Allan Bradgate Davies, New South Wales Police
Detective Senior Constable Ross Dobbie, Queensland Police
Daniel John Doble, Queensland
Byron Willard Douglas, Queensland
Corporal Brenton Edwards, Victoria
Mark Jason Enright, Victoria
Ashleigh Audrey Flanagan, New South Wales
David Michael Grabham, New South Wales
Allan Frederick Harms, New South Wales
Michael James Hay, Queensland
Constable Kim Henderson, Queensland Police
Frederick Charles Hoare, Queensland
Constable Shaun Robert Jones, Queensland Police
Michael Thomas Kennedy, Queensland
Angus Frank Kent, New South Wales
Arthur Koole, Victoria
Jovana Ljubojevic, New South Wales
Senior Constable Rohan Ian McDonald, Queensland Police
Maeve McLoughlin, Northern Ireland
Nathan Scott McSween, Victoria
Nicholas William Macreadie, Victoria
Luke Zac Martin, New South Wales
Constable Megan Louis Meleady, Queensland Police
Ricky Frederick Morse, Queensland
Constable Gregory Arthur Naoum, Queensland Police
David Francis Nolan, Australian Capital Territory 
Senior Constable Sebastian Robinson Pollock, Queensland Police
Arnold Russell Porter, Victoria
Grant Robert Ridley, Australian Capital Territory 
James Anthony Rohan, Victoria
Inspector Christopher Charles Sammut, New South Wales Police
Dr Stephen Anthony Simmons, New South Wales
James Danforth Small, New South Wales
Sergeant Scott Thomas Spence, Queensland Police
Constable Adam Gary Stafford, Queensland Police
Joanna Stavrou, New South Wales
Anthony John Steep, Victoria
Lance Carlyle Till†, late of Queensland
Nathan Elliot Webb, Western Australia

Group Bravery Citation

Ian Gordon Carter, New South Wales
Neil William McLennan, New South Wales
Trevor John McLennan, New South Wales
John James Tapp†, late of New South Wales
Senior Constable Lee James Gadd, Queensland Police
Constable Andrew James Hawkins, Queensland Police
Senior Constable Paul Keith Quin, Queensland Police
Constable Adam Gary Stafford, Queensland Police
The Reverend William Nairn Morris, New South Wales
Peter James Baird, New South Wales
Byron Willard Douglas, Queensland
Douglas John Forsyth,  New South Wales
Sergeant Arthur William Brennan APM, Queensland Police
Senior Constable Sebastian Robinson Pollock, Queensland Police
Robert Callaghan, New South Wales
Michael Stephen Wyllie, New South Wales
Robert Sears, Tasmania

References

Orders, decorations, and medals of Australia
2012 awards in Australia